Muk-jji-ppa is a variant of the two-player game rock paper scissors. It originated in South Korea.

Each person starts with a regular rock paper scissors game. The current winner has to say their next hand and change their hand to the corresponding one. This is usually done by shouting. The point is to get your opponent to make the same hand as you and then you win. However, if your hands don't match, the new winner then calls out their next hand and the process starts over. Both parties then call out the next two possible once someone wins.

References

Korean games
Rock paper scissors